Julián Gómez García-Ribera, better known as Julián Gorkin (January 1901, in Benifairó de les Valls – 8 August 1987, in Paris) was a Spanish revolutionary socialist, writer and a central leader of the Workers' Party of Marxist Unification (POUM) during the Spanish Civil War. He was a writer of many books on political and cultural themes, as well as novels and some plays. After the Spanish Civil War, he escaped to Mexico where he became a part of the strong anti-Stalinist socialist community there. He helped obtain visas for Victor Serge and his son Vlady to enter Mexico when they had to escape from the Nazis invading France.

By the time he returned to Paris in 1948 he had become an anti-communist. From 1953 to 1963 (with a brief interlude in 1959) he was editor in Paris of the periodical Cuadernos published by the CIA front group Congress for Cultural Freedom".

Political writings
 Canibales politicos (Hitler y Stalin en Espana), Ediciones Quetzal, Mexico, 1941
 Ainsi fut assassiné Trotski, Editions Self, Paris, 1948
 La Vie et la Mort en U.R.S.S., Les Iles d'Or, Paris, 1950
 Comunista en Espana y antistalinista en la U.R.S.S., Editorial Guarania, Mexico, 1952
 Destin du XXe siècle, Les Iles d'Or, Paris, 1954
 Marx y la Russia de ayer y de hoy, Editorial Bases, Buenos Aires, 1956
 España, primer ensayo de democracia popular, Biblioteca de la Libertad, Buenos Aires, 1961
 El Imperio Soviético, Editions Claridad, Buenos Aires, 1969
 L'assassinat de Trotski, Julliard, Paris, 1970, et Livre de Poche, Paris, 1973, Prix Voltaire 1970
 El proceso de Moscú en Barcelona, Aymá S.A. Editora, Barcelona, 1973
 El revolucionario profesional, Aymá S.A. Editora, Barcelona, 1975
 Les communistes contre la révolution espagnole, Belfond, Paris, 1978

References

External links
 Julián Gorkin Archive at Marxists Internet Archive
 Marc Ferri Ramírez, "Julián Gorkin, la vida de un luchador"

1901 births
1987 deaths
People from Camp de Morvedre
POUM politicians
Politicians from the Valencian Community
Spanish people of the Spanish Civil War (Republican faction)
Exiles of the Spanish Civil War in Mexico
Spanish expatriates in Mexico
Spanish expatriates in France
Exiles of the Spanish Civil War in France